Paul Clarence Fittery (October 2, 1887 – January 28, 1974) was a Major League Baseball pitcher. Fittery first broke into the major leagues when he was 26 years old on September 5, 1914 with the Cincinnati Reds. His final game was on October 3, 1917. In total, he won 294 minor league games that took place between 1910 and 1930, as compared with 228 losses. His ERA was 3.04 in 4,528 innings in 663 games.

References

External links
 Baseball Almanac
 Baseball Reference
 ESPN
 Sports Illustrated

1887 births
1974 deaths
Baseball players from Pennsylvania
Major League Baseball pitchers
Cincinnati Reds players
Philadelphia Phillies players
Minor league baseball managers
Harrisburg Senators players
Anderson Electricians players
Birmingham Barons players
Evansville River Rats players
Salt Lake City Bees players
Los Angeles Angels (minor league) players
Sacramento Senators players
St. Paul Saints (AA) players
Atlanta Crackers players
Asheville Tourists players
Carrollton Frogs players
Carrollton Champs players
Anniston Nobles players
People from Lebanon, Pennsylvania